Vinodol Hydro Power Plant is a large power plant in Croatia that has three turbines with a nominal capacity of 30 MW each having a total capacity of 90 MW.

It is operated by Hrvatska elektroprivreda.

External links

Hydroelectric power stations in Croatia
Buildings and structures in Primorje-Gorski Kotar County